Arphia ramona, the California orange-winged grasshopper, is a species of band-winged grasshopper in the family Acrididae. It is found in Central America and North America. In California, it is found from the Coast Ranges to Mt. Diablo. Its hind wing is orange.

References

Oedipodinae
Articles created by Qbugbot
Insects described in 1902